Monika Bunke is an East German sprint canoer who competed in the late 1980s and early 1990s. She won five medals at the ICF Canoe Sprint World Championships with three golds (K-2 5000 m: 1989, K-4 500 m: 1989, 1991) and two bronzes (K-2 500 m and K-4 500 m: both 1990).

References

Living people
Year of birth missing (living people)
ICF Canoe Sprint World Championships medalists in kayak
East German female canoeists
West German female canoeists
German female canoeists